Assumption College Sriracha Stadium is a multi-purpose stadium in Sriracha, Chonburi province, Thailand. The stadium is located on the territory of Assumption College Sriracha.

It is currently used mostly for football matches and is the home stadium of Sriracha FC.

Multi-purpose stadiums in Thailand